Alfredo Francisco Martins (born 6 July 1992), known as Alfredo is a Brazilian footballer who plays as a forward for Juventus.

Club career
Born in Americana, São Paulo, Alfredo started his youth career with the academy of local club São Paulo FC. He went on to score 184 goals for the reserve team and also became the top scorer of 2013 Paulista under-20. He spent the 2013 season on loan at Paulista Futebol Clube. On 17 December 2013, he signed for second tier América Futebol Clube (RN). He scored twice in a 5–2 victory over Fluminense FC in Copa do Brasil.

In July 2016, Alfredo joined Portuguese club Portimonense. Soon, he was loaned out to Luverdense Esporte Clube in his native country. In the Campeonato Mato-Grossense, he scored 13 goals in 17 matches with his team winning the championship. He also became the top scorer of the tournament. On 2 January 2017, he joined fellow league club Paysandu Sport Club on a loan deal.

After another stint with Luverdense, Alfredo signed with Uberlândia Esporte Clube for the 2018 Campeonato Mineiro on 29 December 2017.  On 11 June 2018, he moved to Bulgarian club PFC Beroe Stara Zagora.

Career statistics

References

External links

1992 births
Living people
Association football forwards
Brazilian footballers
São Paulo FC players
Paulista Futebol Clube players
América Futebol Clube (RN) players
Portimonense S.C. players
Luverdense Esporte Clube players
Paysandu Sport Club players
Uberlândia Esporte Clube players
PFC Beroe Stara Zagora players
F.C. Penafiel players
Clube Atlético Penapolense players
Barra Futebol Clube players
Clube Atlético Juventus players
Campeonato Brasileiro Série A players
Campeonato Brasileiro Série B players
Campeonato Brasileiro Série D players
Liga Portugal 2 players
First Professional Football League (Bulgaria) players
Brazilian expatriate footballers
Brazilian expatriate sportspeople in Portugal
Brazilian expatriate sportspeople in Bulgaria
Expatriate footballers in Portugal
Expatriate footballers in Bulgaria